Tjaša Iris is a Slovenian-born artist, known for her digital art, photographs and large paintings painted with bright colors, vivid atmospheres of gardens with lush vegetation and bright light. Color is the main concern in her painting, exploring its emotional and expressive qualities.

Early life
After a year of studying International Relations – Political Science at the University of Ljubljana, Slovenia, she moved to Florence, Italy, at the age of 18 which meant a new birth for her. She started to study photography and painting at a private art school: International School of Fine Art Fortman Studios, in Via Fiesolana 34r, historically the first art school in Italy that was offering study of photography as an art form, where she studied photography and painting and gained a diploma in 1991. She continued her study of photography at Staffordhaire Polytecnic for a semester in Stoke-on-Trent. Later she continued her studies at Audio-Visual Department at Academie Minerva in Groningen, The Netherlands, where she earned her M.A. in Fine Arts (painting) in 1995.

Career
In 1994 she moved to Treviso, Italy (near Venice) where she got herself her first studio, a 3.5 × 3.5 m room in an abandoned factory where specially in year 1996 she produced a huge amount of very big size paintings. 
In December 1997 she moved to Venice for seven years. Where besides painting at her home, a primo piano nobile Venetian Palace apartment with painted ceilings at San Marco 2569 she started holding painting workshops in Tuscany, Provence, Puglia and Slovenia. She also worked at Slovenian Gallery and Slovenian Pavilion at The Venice Biennale – Galleria A+A.

She spent a winter in Paris at Cite' Internationale des Arts an international artist's residency. On and off two years in Lake Tahoe Area of the Sierra Mountains in California, until she bought a villa in the Branik village, Pre-Coastal Wine Country of Slovenia in 2004. Located ten min from Italian border about an hour East from Ljubljana and West from Venice. In the years 2004–2010 she continued working winters at Cite International des Arts in Paris while one winter she spent in Morocco, studying the colors there.

During the years 1996–2011 she dedicated much of her time to her painting workshops. She had workshop participants from all six continents, many of them became her collectors and art patrons. With this unconventional marketing of her work, she was able to work around the usual gallery world at the same time placing paintings into private collections on all six continents.

At Villa Flora her painting went into a full swing. 
In 2008 she was ready for a higher level of solo exhibitions that later took place in Koper, Slovenia, Singapore, Ubud, Bali, Indonesia, Kuala Lumpur, Chiang Mai and Bangkok Thailand.

Due to her character of always being attracted by the places where the things are moving, she visited Hong Kong in 2009, Singapore and surrounding countries in 2010, and in 2012.

In November 2013 she had her first bigger solo museum show at Chiang Mai CMU Art Museum. The exhibition later moved to Bangkok, to Jamjuree Art Gallery, an Art Museum of Chulalongkorn University in Bangkok was opened until 16 January 2014.

During 2013 and 2014 she created over 200 limited edition prints. In 2014 three books were published with Blurb, curated by writer Angela Rosental. Tjaša Iris: Gardens of Eden, 170 Limited Edition Prints of 35. Tjaša Iris: Joy of Nature, Special Editions of 5. Tjaša Iris: Paradise from a New Dimension, Special Editions of 5.

From 2011 until 2015 she made Chiang Mai, Thailand her primary home.

In 2015 – 2018 she lived a nomadic life traveling between Thailand, Cambodia, Malaysia and Singapore. As a result of it she did more photography than painting. In May 2017 she gathered all her works of eight years and published a book of her photography from years 2009 – 2017 with the title: "Tjaša Iris – 8 Winters in South East Asia – A European Under the Tropics", available at Amazon.com.

In August 2017 she had a solo exhibition at BACC Bangkok Arts & Culture Center, one of the biggest art institutions/museum in South East Asia visited by over 1 million people per year, so about 100 000 saw her exhibition of paintings and photographs which was very well accepted.,.
In March 2020 she got stranded in Koh Phangan Island in Thailand, where she created an extensive series of digitaly manipulated photographs titled: Sea Garden Series - Stranded on a Peaceful Island.

Work
Tjaša Iris is an exceptional colorist. While in her earlier work there were many landscapes and less gardens in her work of the last ten years we see mostly gardens with lush vegetation. She dedicates most of her exhibitions to these themes. Her earlier work always had origins in Southern Europe, the Mediterranean part of Europe. She loves nothing but strong light and bright colors. Her colors came right from the tube. She is only buying most bright pigments of any brand. Her work of the last three years describe beautiful flowers and lush tropical gardens in bright, vivid, lush colors. Her paintings are full of a powerful unique energy. Her roots are in Expressionism, a modernist movement in Europe from the beginning of the last century. The movement's typical trait was to present the world solely from a subjective perspective, distorting it radically for emotional effect in order to evoke moods or ideas. Expressionist artists sought to express meaning or emotional experience rather than physical reality. Her work is a continuation of these concerns.

Color is the main concern in her paintings, exploring the emotional and expressive qualities. She says: "It is about how colors just come at you or move away from you." Her colors are used freely and vibrantly. The paintings vibrate with the contrasts of light and dark, bright and dull and warm and cold. She is today more than ever an avid traveler, and she captures the essence of the places she visits in vibrant sometimes more descriptive while sometimes more abstracted pictures. Gardens with lush tropical vegetation and ornaments, busy landscapes with swirling clouds, Botanic Gardens of Singapore, Thai King's Phu Ping Palace Gardens in Chiang Mai, gardens in Bali and Kuala Lumpur, Castello di Miramare gardens in Trieste, located only about 20 km from her Slovenian residency and studio at Branik village... Through her use of color and shape she captivates the viewer with her joyful celebration of life through her art. The explosive energy of South East Asia is making her paintings even more vivid and vibrant. She is also spending much time studying physics, the new studies about what the scientists have to say about the 5th, 6th, 7th ... dimension. Quantum physics. Facts about energy and matter. The fact that colors have waves moving toward us or moving away from us..

Tjaša Iris is continuing in her own research in color as well as adding the atmosphere of today's world to it. Her paintings on paper and canvas give you the feel of the flatness of a computer screen. Her large paintings on jute add another dimension to it. She is a clear representative of the Internet Generation. Her busy complex compositions reflect the busy loud information era of the fast moving time of today.

Her photographs and paintings are a dream world of happy atmospheres, strong light and uplifting lush colors. In this era of economic recession, some call her the anti-depressionist artist due to the uplifting energy that her paintings emanate.

Early paintings
These are paintings of landscapes and gardens she painted mostly in Italy, Slovenia and Croatia. these are more immediate works than the paintings from her later period. Brush strokes are big, fast, very lose, very fresh. Colors are very bright.

European Paintings 2005 – 2011
From this period on she dedicates herself to mostly paint gardens with lush vegetation. During her stays at Villa Flora in Slovenia she spends much time painting in the nearby Miramare Castle gardens at Riviera di Trieste (Alberi, Gardener's House). She is as well constantly travelling to Publia, Southern Italy from where is originating the painting Pezze. To Capri and Amalfi coast (Capri, Palme e Vasi, Entrance).

Asian Paintings 2010 – 2013
This is her an even more atmosphere work. It appears like from a "New Dimension". It is detailed and complex. Paintings are from her favorite painting locations in Asia as Botanical Gardens in Singapore, Bali, Thai King's gardens in Chiang mai, Thailand, Hong Kong gardens...

Exhibitions

Solo

(* indicates a publication)
 2018 BANGKOK, THAILAND Austrian Embassy, "Day & Night", 28 March – 25 July. 
 2017 BANGKOK, THAILAND, "Gardens of Eden – Paintings from a New Dimension" at BACC Bangkok Art & Culture Center, 3–27 August.
 2014 – 2015 CHIANG MAI, THAILAND, "Gardens of Eden" at 137 Pillar House Art Gallery, 14 December 2014 – 15 March 2015.
 2013 BANGKOK, THAILAND, "Gardens of Eden" at Jamjuree (State) Art Gallery, an Art Museum of Chulalongkorn University, 26 December 2013 – 16 January 2014. *
 2013 CHIANG MAI, THAILAND, "Gardens of Eden" at CMU Art Museum – University Art Center, 8–30 November. *
 2012 SINGAPORE, "The Substation" Contemporary Art Center, 22 May – 2 June 2012.
 2011 BANGKOK, THAILAND, "Garden of Eden", Neilson Hays Rotunda Gallery.
 2011 KUALA LUMPUR, MALAYSIA, UCSI Kuala Lumpur University. *
 2010 UBUD, BALI, INDONESIA, Wina Gallery. (two women show)
 2010 SINGAPORE, AAF – The Affordable Art Fair Singapore, E7. *
 2010 SINGAPORE, As NEW FIND at ART SINGAPORE 2010. *
 2010 SINGAPORE, Instinc Art Gallery. *
 2009 KOPER, SLOVENIA, Gallery Meduza, Coastal Galleries Piran. *
 2005 BRANIK, SLOVENIA, Villa Flora. Open Studio "PARIS PAINTINGS".
 2005 PARIS, FRANCE Two man show Tjaša Demšar and Diek Grobler (South Africa), Cite´International des Arts.
 2003 ONLINE, U.S.A., d’ART Gallery
 2000 MURSKA SOBOTA, SLOVENIA, Gallery Murska Sobota. *
 1999 SKOFJA LOKA, SLOVENIA, Gallery Groharjeva. *
 1998 IZOLA, SLOVENIA, Gallery Insula.
 1998 LJUBLJANA, SLOVENIA. Gallery Krka. *
 1998 PAESE, TREVISO, ITALY, Municipal Gallery.
 1997 CAERANO DI SAN MARCO, TREVISO, ITALY. Gallery Villa Benzi Zecchini.
 1996 AMSTERDAM, THE NETHERLANDS, ART EXPO, Amsterdam RAI.
 1993 GRONINGEN, THE NETHERLANDS, "Yellow Labyrinth", Gallery "S«.*

Group exhibitions

(* indicates a publication)
 2017 PONTREMOLI, ITALY, Pontremoli International Photography Festival, Tuscany, Italy 1–30 July
 2017 KUALA LUMPUR, MALAYSIA, Joy of Life Exhibition, at PORT Commune*
 2016 NEW DELHI, INDIA, SLOVENINDIA – Contemporary Art From Slovenia, at National Gallery of Modern Art*
 2015 TRIESTE, ITALY, Gardens of Eden, at MINIMU Art Center
 2012 IDRIJA, SLOVENIA, Slovenia Opened for Art Sinji Vrh International Art Symposium at Gewerkenegg Museum of Idria
 2012 GORIZIA, ITALY, Slovenia Opened for Art Sinji Vrh International Art Symposium at Cosic Gallery
 2012 RADOVLJICA, SLOVENIA, Slovenia Opened for Art Sinji Vrh International Art Symposium at Sivceva hisa Museum
 2012 CHIANG MAI, THAILAND, 116 Art Gallery, "Nouvelle Expressionisme" (four women show), 15 December 2011 12.   Feb. 2012. *
 2011 SEŽANA, SLOVENIA, Slovenia Opened for Art Sinji Vrh International Art Symposium at Srecko Kosovel Cultural Art Center *
 2011 BREŽICE, SLOVENIA Franc Les Art Collection at Brezice Posavski Museum, 11. Nov. 2011 – 8. Jan. *
 2011 SIENA, ITALY "Drawing Connections", Siena Art Institute – founded by John Getty III, 24 Sep
 2011 SINJI VRH, SLOVENIA, Slovenia Opened for Art, 1 July *
 2011 AJDOVŠČINA, SLOVENIA, Slovenia Opened for Art, at Lična hisa Art Gallery 30 June *
 2011  ČATEZ OB SAVI, SLOVENIA, "Franc Les"  Artist Colony at County Hall.
 2010  ŠENCUR, SLOVENIA, "Zlata Ribica" Art Collection at Šenčur Museum. *
 2010 BOVEC, SLOVENIA, "Zlata Ribica" Art Collection, Fortress Kluže Exhibition Space. *
 2010 HONG KONG, "Unwrap Your Mind", That Gallery.
 2010 SLOVENJ GRADEC, SLOVENIJA, Majski salon *
 2010 HONG KONG, "4x6", That Gallery.
 2010 TOLMIN, SLOVENIA, "Zlata Ribica" Artist in Residency, Tolmin Public Library Exhibition Space. *
 2009 PIRAN, SLOVENIA, Ex-Tempore Piran, Coastal Galleries Piran.
 2009 BRANIK, SLOVENIA, Villa Flora Artist's Residency Program. Villa Flora.
 2009 CASTAGNO, TUSCANY, ITALY, Artist's Colony Atelier d'Artista, "Il Genio Fiorentino Art Festival". Villa Castagno.
 2009 GAMBASI TERME, TUSCANY, ITALY, Artist's Colony Atelier d'Artista. "Il Genio Fiorentino Art Festival". Piazza Gambasi Terme.
 2008 MEDANA, SLOVENIA, "MMM art" Artist's Colony. Klinec.
 2008 BRANIK, SLOVENIA, Villa Flora Artist's Residency Program. Villa Flora.
 2008 BARCELONA, SPAIN, "Artterre Group", Galeria Zero.
 2008 PIRAN, SLOVENIA, Ex-Tempore Piran, Magazin Monfort.
 2008 LJUBLJANA, SLOVENIA, "Members of Kranj Artist's Association", Galerija ZDSLU.
 2007 LJUBLJANA, SLOVENIA, "December Holiday Sale", Galerija ZDSLU.
 2007 PIRAN, SLOVENIA, Ex-Tempore Piran, Magazin Monfort.
 2007 MURSKA SOBOTA, SLOVENIA, Majski salon, Galerija Murska Sobota *
 2006 CAMPELLO SUL CLITUGNNO, ITALY, "Vita bellissima", Studio Lithos.
 2004 CAMPELLO SUL CLITUGNNO, ITALY, "Ecce Uomo", Studio Lithos.
 2003 PRETORIA, SOUTH AFRICA, Mind's I Art Space.
 2003 PRETORIA, SOUTH AFRICA, "FINE LINE", Mind's I Art Space.
 2002 PRETORIA, SOUTH AFRICA "MAIL ART", Mind's I Art Space.
 2002 KRANJ, SLOVENIA, Kranj Biennal. France Prešern House, Kranj Museum. *
 2002 PASIANO DI PORDENONE, ITALY, "FOUR WOMAN ARTISTS EXHIBITION", Villa Saccomani, *
 2000 KOPER, SLOVENIA, "December Exhibition", Galerija Meduza.
 1998 KRANJ, SLOVENIA, "May Days", Mala Gallery, Kranjski Museum.
 1997 IZOLA, SLOVENIA, "Marine Universe". Gallery Alga.
 1997 IZOLA, SLOVENIA, EX TEMPORE – Korte nad Izolo.
 1995 MARIBOR, SLOVENIA, First Slovenian Festival of Computer art, Maribor Contemporary Art Center.
 1995 GRONINGEN, THE NETHERLANDS, "Minerva Artists", Martini Zichenhuis.
 1995 GRONINGEN, THE NETHERLANDS, "Minerva Artists", Martini hall.
 1994 ORVELTE, DRENTHE, THE NETHERLANDS, "The Path of Painters", Orvelte, 12th century village – museum orders her a painting (1,5 x 2,5 m), that will remain exhibited in the country – side near Orvelte for the following ten years.
 1992 GRONINGEN, THE NETHERLANDS, "Blue Labyrinth". Gallery "Biemonds Belang".
 1990-2 FLORENCE, ITALY "Photography Exhibitions", International School of Fine Art Fortman Studios.

Artist residencies

 2017 KUALA LUMPUR, MALAYSIA, Oriental Heritage House at Sentul, Nov.- Dec.
 2016 KUALA LUMPUR, MALAYSIA, Oriental Heritage House at Sentul, Nov.- Dec.
 2011 SINJI VRH, SLOVENIA, "Slovenia Opened for Art" – International Art Symposium
 2011  ČATEŽ OB SAVI, SLOVENIA, "Franc Les"  Artist Colony
 2011 CHIANG MAI, THAILAND 116 Art Gallery Residency
 2011 UBUD, BALI, INDONESIA Villa Flora in Bali Artist in Residency Program
 2010 TOLMIN, SLOVENIA Zlata Ribica Art Colony
 2010 SINGAPORE Instinc Artist in Residency Program
 2009 BRANIK, SLOVENIA Villa Flora Artist in Residency Program
 2009 GAMBASSI TERME, TUSCANY, ITALY Atelier d’Artista Artist's Residency, "Il Genio Fiorentino Festival"
 2008 MEDANA, SLOVENIA MMM Art, Artist's Colony
 2008 BRANIK, SLOVENIA Villa Flora Artist in Residency Program
 2007 PARIS, FRANCE Grant from French Ministry for External Affaires for a 2-month stay at Cite´ International des Arts.
 2006 PARIS, FRANCE Grant from Slovenian Art Association for a 2-month stay at Cite´ International des Arts
 2005 PARIS, FRANCE Grant from Slovenian Art Association for a 2-month stay at Cite´ International des Arts.
 2000 PARIS, FRANCE Grant from Slovenian Art Association for a 2-month stay at Cite´ International des Arts.

References
 2018 Vithya Segar, Is Political Art Pushing Other Forms of Art to the Periphery? (on art of Tjaša Iris)
 2012 Juliet Art Magazine, Italy. Article: Tjaša Iris – Garden of Eden, December, p. 68, by Angela Rosenthal.
 2012 The Substation Arts Center, Singapore.  Exhibition: Tjaša Iris – Paintings from a New Dimension, May – June 2012. 
 2012 Bangkok Post, Thailand, Article, Tjaša Iris: Garden of Eden Exhibition, by Angelique Leijdekker, 30 Jan
 2011 Chiang Mai Mail, Thailand,(English On-line Newspaper), Article by Jai-Pee Jean-Pierre Kirkgard
 2011  "Umetniki pred mikrofonom" (Artists in front of Microphone), Interview with Tjaša Iris, by Tatjana Gregorič, SLOVENIA 3 National Radio, 16 July at 11.05 am.
 2011  One Hour Radio Interview with Tjaša Iris, by Tatjana Gregorič, Slovenian National Radio & Radio Koper, 10 May at 8 pm.
 2010  Article, by Henny Handayani, Bali Voice Art Magazine, Indonesia, "Happy Place", Jan.
 2010  Radio interview, by Tatjana Gregorič, Slovenian National Radio & Radio Koper, "Interview with Tjaša Iris", 28 May
 2010  ARTS Beat, Singapore Event Guide, 25 Feb – 3 Mar Article "Garden of Eden"
 2010  ARTS Beat, Singapore Event Guide, 11–24 Feb "Garden of Eden"
 2009 Tjaša Iris, SLIKE (Paintings), Piran, Slovenia : Obalne Galerije, text Tatjana Sirk.
 2009 Article in national daily newspaper, by Alenka Penjak, "Healthy Mind in the Crimson of Fire", Primorske novice, Koper, Slovenia, 3. May
 2009 National TV evening news video, by Emanuella Gherardi Seppi, "Painting Exhibition of Tjaša Iris at Gallery Meduza", Slovenian National TV – Koper – Capodistria, 6 May
 2008 Radio interview, by Tatjana Gregorič, "Interview with Tjaša Iris", Slovenian National Radio & Radio Koper, 8 Sep
 2008 8 min long TV Program by TV Primorka, Nova Gorica, Slovenia, Interview with Tjaša Iris about her work and the First Artis's Residency Program at Villa Flora Session, 30 August.

References

External links
 

1968 births
Living people
Slovenian women artists
Slovenian painters
Artists from Kranj